A doof or bush doof is a type of outdoor dance party generally held in a remote country area, or outside a large city in surrounding bush or rainforest. Events referred to as doofs are now held worldwide and have built from a small set of social groups to a subculture with millions of active members worldwide, considered by some as a full blown culture similar to raves or teknivals. Doofs generally have healing workshops, speakers, art, live artists and DJs playing a range of electronic music, commonly goa, house, dub techno, Techno, acid heavy sounds and psychedelic trance.

"Doof doof" is an Australian term for loud electronic music centred on a heavy bass drum kick.

Etymology
The name is onomatopoeic, and is derived from the sound of the kick drum used in the electronic music frequently lettered (as in "doof doof doof doof music").  According to Peter Strong, the original term "doof" was created in Newtown, Sydney in Spring 1992, after a neighbour of the Non Bossy Posse knocked on the door to complain about their music: "What is this Doof Doof Doof I hear all night long, this is not music" she exclaimed. The term did not become a popular designation for outdoor dance parties until after the mid-1990s. Since 2017 in Melbourne, smaller doofs have sometimes been referred to as a "doif", after a local tech-house DJ, LOIF, headlined several smaller parties. This was initially a pushback to festivals like Pitch Music & Arts Festival, which "doofers" felt was too large to share the name with the more intimate parties from which the term originated.

History 
During the 1990s free dance parties proliferated in Sydney, particularly in Sydney Park in St Peters and warehouses of the Inner West. As pressure from police and councils increased, holding parties in the bush appeared as a more viable option.

The first commercial doof party to be hosted within Australia and New Zealand was Earthcore in 1993. Today the term 'doof' can describe anything from a small gathering in the bush focused around a small sound system to a multi-day, multi-stage event with DJs, bands and workshops.

In 2013, "bush doof" was added to the sixth edition of the Macquarie Dictionary.

Radio stations
There are 'doof' radio stations that serve as focal points for a worldwide community, including:
 Human Borg Repellent One Radio (HBR1 Radio)
 Digital Gunfire
 Jungle Train
 SomaFM
 Icecast Directory / Xiph Radio Directory

List of doofs

Earthcore (1992–2017)
Rainbow Serpent Festival (1997–present)
MardiGrass
Maitreya Festival (discontinued)
Earthdance
BW Summer Festival
Isotopia Festival
Boom
Daniça
Twisted Frequency

See also 

List of electronic music festivals
List of festivals in Australia

References

Inline

General
 The Doof-Doof Music, B.J. Coman, Quadrant Magazine,  January 2005 – Volume XLIX Number 1–2
 Doof Metronome/Chronometer, Dr. Simon .A. Roberts (Founding member – Sydney – Creator of this page within first 10k, also Titan: Ullysis), June 1996 ~ ntp.conf + Chronolabs Cooperative / Wiki / NTP Servers Pooling + Chronolabs Cooperative / Wiki / See No Evil Open DNS

Psychedelic trance
Dance culture
Australian styles of music
Australian fringe and underground culture
Musical subcultures